The 1951 All-Ireland Senior Hurling Championship was the 65th staging of the All-Ireland hurling championship since its establishment by the Gaelic Athletic Association in 1887. The championship began on 6 May 1951 and ended on 2 September 1951.

Tipperary were the defending champions, and retained their All-Ireland crown following a 7-7 to 3-9 defeat of Wexford.

Teams

Team summaries

Results

Leinster Senior Hurling Championship

First round

Semi-finals

Final

Munster Senior Hurling Championship

First round

Semi-finals

Final

All-Ireland Senior Hurling Championship

Semi-final

Final

Championship statistics

Top scorers

Top scorers overall

Top scorers in a single game

Scoring

Widest winning margin: 22 points 
Dublin 6-10 - 0-6 Westmeath (Leinster quarter-final, 6 May 1951)
Most goals in a match: 10 
Tipperary 7-7 - 3-9 Wexford (All-Ireland final, 2 September 1951)
Most points in a match: 20 
Tipperary 2-10 - 1-10 Waterford (Munster quarter-final, 10 June 1951)
Tipperary 2-11 - 2-9 Cork (Munster final, 30 July 1951)
Wexford 3-11 - 2-9 Galway (All-Ireland semi-final, 30 July 1951)
Most goals by one team in a match: 7 
Tipperary 7-7 - 3-9 Wexford (All-Ireland final, 2 September 1951)
Most goals scored by a losing team: 4 
Dublin 4-6 - 6-9 Wexford (Leinster semi-final, 17 June 1951)
Laois 4-3 - 3-12 Wexford (Leinster final, 15 July 1951)
Most points scored by a losing team: 10 
Waterford 1-10 - 2-10 Tipperary (Munster quarter-final, 10 June 1951)

Miscellaneous

 Wexford win their first Leinster title since 1918. The team also qualify for their first All-Ireland decider since then.
 A colour clash between Wexford and Tipperary in the All-Ireland final resulted in both sides wearing their provincial colours.  Tipperary wore the blue of Munster while Wexford wore the green of Leinster.
 Tipperary win their 16th All-Ireland title and join Cork as joint leaders on the all-time roll of honour.

Sources

 Corry, Eoghan, The GAA Book of Lists (Hodder Headline Ireland, 2005).
 Donegan, Des, The Complete Handbook of Gaelic Games (DBA Publications Limited, 2005).
 Sweeney, Éamonn, Munster Hurling Legends (The O'Brien Press, 2002).

External links
 1951 All-Ireland Senior Hurling Championship results

References

1951